Anton Cajetan Adlgasser (sometimes Anton Cajetan Adelgasser; 1 October 1729 – 23 December 1777) was a German organist and composer at Salzburg Cathedral and at court, and composed a good deal of liturgical music (including eight masses and two requiems) as well as oratorios and orchestral and keyboard works.

Born in Inzell, Bavaria, he moved to Salzburg, where he studied under Johann Ernst Eberlin. From 1750 he was organist at the Salzburg Cathedral, where he remained the rest of his life. 
After a visit to Italy in 1764–5 he set Metastasio's La Nitteti (his only opera) performed in Salzburg (1767), and in 1767 he collaborated with Mozart and Michael Haydn on the oratorio Die Schuldigkeit des ersten Gebots. Adlgasser's first marriage, in 1752, was to Maria Josepha, the daughter of his predecessor, J.E. Eberlin, at Salzburg Cathedral. Four years later he married Maria Barbara Schwab, and in 1769 the court singer Maria Anna Fesemayer (1743–82), who sang in Die Schuldigkeit and created the role of Ninetta in La finta semplice. Leopold Mozart stood witness to the third wedding.

He died at Salzburg in 1777 of a stroke suffered while playing the organ.

References

External links 
 
 

1729 births
1777 deaths
People from Traunstein (district)
18th-century classical composers
Austrian classical organists
German classical organists
German male organists
Austrian classical composers
German Classical-period composers
Austrian people of German descent
18th-century keyboardists
German male classical composers
18th-century Austrian musicians
18th-century Austrian male musicians
18th-century German composers
Male classical organists